Yoo Jeong-bok (born 17 June 1957) is a South Korean public servant and politician who served as the mayor of Incheon from 1 July 2014 to 30 June 2018.

Life 
Yoo Jeong-bok was born on 17 June 1957, in Songrim-dong of Dong District, Incheon. His parents were Internally displaced person from Cheongdan area, Hwanghae Province

He passed the civil service exam in his last year of college. After serving in the military, he became a public servant. In 1994, he was appointed a mayor of Gimpo County. He agreed absorption of Geomdan Myeon into Incheon and appointed as a mayor of Seo District, Incheon, which absorbed Geomdan Myeon. In 1995, South Korea expanded local autonomy. He resigned to run for 1995 South Korean local elections and elected as a mayor of Gimpo County. In 1998, Gimpo County was promoted to Gimpo city. He served two terms for Mayor of Gimpo. After the loss in 2002 South Korean local elections, he was elected as a member of the National Assembly to represent Gimpo three times since 2004. In 2014, he resigned his seat in the National Assembly to run for Mayor of Incheon and elected. He lost in 2018 election but he was elected in 2022.

On 31 August 2022, he announced administrative reorganization plans for Incheon. Geomdan will become a new separate District from Seo District. Old downtown area of Jung District and Dong District District will be merged into Jemulpo District and Yeongjong-Yongyu will be an independent Yeongjong District. Mayors of Jung, Dong and Seo District agreed this proposal.

References

1957 births
Living people
People from Incheon
Yonsei University alumni
Seoul National University alumni
Members of the National Assembly (South Korea)
Ministers of Agriculture of South Korea
Interior ministers of South Korea
People Power Party (South Korea) politicians
Mayors of Incheon